The CANT Z.504 was a prototype reconnaissance biplane flying boat made by CANT in the 1930s.

Development
Since the 1920s the Regia Aeronautica evaluated the opportunity to equip some of its units with support aircraft. To overcome the difficulties of use in the presence of heavy seas, launch structures were installed, real and proper, on which was appropriately fixed the aircraft that was brought at a speed sufficient to allow take-off.

After using various seaplanes designed for civil use such as Macchi M.18, or more specific Piaggio P.6 and CANT 25, in 1933 the Ministry of Aeronautics on behalf of the Regia Marina, issued a specification for the supply of a new two-seater aircraft to be used in the roles of reconnaissance and hunting, and able to replace the previous designs and characterized mainly from a single-engine configuration.

The Z.504 flew on September 1, 1934, but lost out to the IMAM Ro.43 for the production contract. The Z.504 was later owned by the brothers Callisto and Alberto Cosulich, where it was presumably used as a training aircraft.

Design
The Z.504 was designed by Filippo Zappata, the successor to Raffaele Conflenti, chief designer at CANT. The aircraft was characterized by a biplane veiling, the only model of Zappata to use it, and by a central hull configuration with an aerodynamically well-groomed profile.

Specifications

See also

References

Further reading

Z.0504
1930s Italian patrol aircraft
Flying boats